René Arseneault  (born July 1, 1966) is a Canadian politician who was elected to represent the riding of Madawaska—Restigouche in the House of Commons of Canada in the 2015 federal election, and was re-elected in the 2019 federal election.

Background

Arseneault earned an undergraduate degree in economics and political science, followed by a law degree from the Université de Moncton. He established a law practice with his wife Michèle Pelletier in 1996.

Political life
Arsenault was elected as a Member of Parliament for Madawaska—Restigouche in the 2015 federal election.

He broke ranks from a majority of his fellow Liberals when he voted against a Conservative Party motion condemning the BDS movement.

Arsenault was named Parliamentary Secretary to the Minister of Economic Development and Official Languages (Atlantic Canada Opportunities Agency and Official Languages) on December 12, 2019.

Electoral record

References

External links

Living people
Members of the House of Commons of Canada from New Brunswick
Liberal Party of Canada MPs
Université de Moncton alumni
Lawyers in New Brunswick
Université de Moncton École de droit alumni
21st-century Canadian politicians
People from Restigouche County, New Brunswick
1966 births